Hannah O'Brien Chaplin Conant (Chaplin; pen name, H. C. Conant; September 5, 1809February 18, 1865) was an American biblical scholar.

Biography
Hannah O'Brien Chaplin was born in Danvers, Massachusetts, September 5, 1809. Her father was a clergyman. In 1830, she was married to Thomas Jefferson Conant, and in 1838 she became the editor of The Mother's Journal. She translated from the German Strauss' Baptism in Jordan, Neander's commentary on Philippians, and works by other authors. Her works are The Earnest Man, an excellent biography of Adoniram Judson (1855), and a Popular History of English Bible Translation (1856). She was an able assistant in her husband's Hebrew studies.

Selected works
 The earnest man : a sketch of the character and labors of Adoniram Judson, first missionary to Burmah  (1855)
 Popular History of English Bible Translation (1856)
 The English Bible. History of the translation of the Holy Scriptures into the English tongue. With specimens of the old English versions (1856)
 The popular history of the translation of the Holy Scriptures into the English tongue. With specimens of the old English versions (1880)

References

 

1809 births
1865 deaths
Conant family
People from Danvers, Massachusetts
American biblical scholars
German–English translators
American magazine editors
Women magazine editors
19th-century American journalists
19th-century translators
Female biblical scholars
19th-century pseudonymous writers